WGCL (1370 kHz) is a commercial AM radio station in Bloomington, Indiana, serving Monroe County. The station is owned by Sarkes Tarzian, Inc. along with sister station WTTS 92.3 FM.  WGCL broadcasts a talk radio format with programming from CBS Sports Radio in the evening.  The radio studios and offices are on West 7th Street in Bloomington.

By day, WGCL is powered at 5,000 watts.  But to avoid interference to other stations on 1370 AM, at night it reduces power to 500 watts.  It uses a directional antenna at all times.  Programming is also heard on 250 watt FM translator W254DP at 98.7 MHz.

Programming
On weekdays, WGCL airs a mix of local and nationally syndicated talk shows.  In morning drive time, Kent Sterling is heard.  In PM drive, another local show, "Glass in the Afternoon" airs.  And Tony Katz is carried in early afternoons from WIBC Indianapolis.  Syndicated weekday shows include The Ramsey Show with Dave Ramsey, This Morning, America's First News with Gordon Deal and Coast to Coast AM with George Noory.  Evenings feature programming from the CBS Sports Radio Network.  In the fall, high school football is heard on Friday evenings.

On weekends, syndicated programs include The Kim Komando Show, The Hugh Hewitt Show, Bill Handel on the Law and At Home with Gary Sullivan.  WGCL carries live sports including the Indianapolis Colts, Indiana Pacers and Cincinnati Reds.  Most hours begin with an update from Fox News Radio, followed by local news and weather.

History
On , the station first signed on the air.  It has always been owned by Sarkes Tarzian, Inc.  The station's original call sign was WTTS, powered at 1,000 watts by day, 500 watts at night.  It was Bloomington's third AM radio station, the others being WSUA 1010 (1946–50) and WTOM 1490 (1947–51).  From the 1950s until the 1984, WTTS was a full-service, middle of the road (MOR) station, playing popular adult music, news and sports.  It was a network affiliate of ABC Radio prior to that network's 1967 split, and the ABC Entertainment Network after that.

In November 1949, Sarkes Tarzian put television station WTTV Channel 4 on the air.  Tarzian owned it until 1978.  In 1960, sister station WTTV-FM 92.3 went on the air, simulcasting 1370 WTTS until 1967, when it switched to a separate format. 

WTTS changed its call letters to WGTC on July 9, 1984, flipping to a full-service, country music format. On November 17, 1988, the station changed its call sign to the current WGCL.  It ended music programming, moving to a talk radio format.

FM translator

WGCL added an FM translator, originally at 96.1 MHz, W241CD.   It later switched its translator simulcast to 98.7 MHz, W254DP.

References

External links
FCC History Cards for WGCL

1949 establishments in Indiana
News and talk radio stations in the United States
GCL (AM)
Sports radio stations in the United States
Radio stations established in 1949